Karen Sandler (born in Gardena, California) is an American author of romance, young adult, science fiction, and mystery novels.

Biography
Karen Sandler was born in Gardena, California to a Jewish family, the daughter Samuel Stier and Barbara Joan (Russo) Stier, and raised nearby, in Hawthorne. After receiving a B.A. in mathematics with a minor in physics in 1976 from California State University, Dominguez Hills, Sandler worked as a software engineer at Rockwell International in Downey, California on the Space Shuttle project. In 1978 she became a member of the technical staff at Hughes Aircraft Company, working with communications satellites. In 1979, she completed her M.S. in computer science at UCLA. She married her husband, Gary Sandler, in 1981, and later had two sons. The family moved from Southern to Northern California in 1993, at which time Sandler became a stay-at-home mom.

While raising her two boys, Sandler wrote in her spare time, completing three romance novels before selling her first (Just My Imagination) to Kensington Books. One of the pioneers of electronic publishing, Sandler saw her first electronic book, Eternity, published by Hard Shell Word Factory in 1998. She's a member of Authors Guild, the Society of Children's Book Writers and Illustrators.

Bibliography

Young adult science fiction

Tankborn (2011)
Awakening (2013)
Rebellion (2014)
Lee and Low/Tu Books

Middle grade time travel
Time in a Bottle
Hard Shell Word Factory (e-Book, Trade Paperback, 2004)
Author edition (Timewrecked, e-book, 2012)

Adult mystery
Clean Burn (Janelle Watson Mysteries)
Exhibit A Books (Trade Paperback, ebook, 2013)

Romantic comedy

Just My Imagination
Kensington Publishing (Mass Market, 1998)
Thorndike Press (Large Print, 2002)
Hard Shell Word Factory (e-book, Trade Paperback, 2005)
Author edition (Loves Me, Loves Me Not, e-book, 2012)
Table for Two
Kensington Publishing (Mass Market, 1998)
Thorndike Press & Chivers (Large Print, 2003)
Hard Shell Word Factory (e-book, Trade Paperback, 2005)
Author edition (His Make-Believe Wife, e-book, 2012)
The Right Mr. Wrong
Hard Shell Word Factory (e-book, Trade Paperback, 2002)
Thorndike Press (Large Print, 2005)
Author edition (Blonde Luck, Love Be a Lady, e-book, 2012)
Chocolate Magic
Five Star (Hardcover, 2004, Trade & Large Print 2005)
Awe-struck Books (e-book, 2005)
Author edition (Sweet Dream Lover, e-book, 2012)

Paranormal/science fiction romance

Eternity
Hard Shell Word Factory (e-book, Trade Paperback, 2001)
Thorndike Press (Large Print, 2004)
Unforgettable
Berkley Jove (Mass Market, 1999)
Ulverscroft (Large Print, 2006)
Author edition (The In-Between, Another Chance at Heaven e-book, 2012)
Night Whispers
Berkley Jove (Mass Market, 1999)
Ulverscroft (Large Print, 2006)
Author Edition (Dark Whispers, e-book, 2012)

Silhouette special edition

The Boss's Baby Bargain (2002)
Counting on a Cowboy (2003)
A Father's Sacrifice (2004)
His Baby to Love (2005)
The Three-Way Miracle (2006)
Her Baby's Hero (2006)
His Miracle Baby (2008)
Her Miracle Man (2008)
Their Second-Chance Child (2009)
The Family He Wanted (2009)

References

External links
Karen Sandler's website
Karen Sandler's Blog

Year of birth missing (living people)
American fiction writers
Jewish American novelists
Writers from California
People from Gardena, California
California State University, Dominguez Hills alumni
University of California, Los Angeles alumni
Living people
21st-century American Jews